She Came to the Valley is a western-genre film, shot in 1977 and released in 1979. Directed by Albert Band, it stars Ronee Blakley, Scott Glenn, Freddy Fender, and Dean Stockwell. It is based on a novel by Cleo Dawson.

Plot
A poor family that leaves Oklahoma for Texas are persuaded by a drifter to move to the valley. It is discovered that the drifter is a supporter of the revolutionary leader Pancho Villa. The family become involved in a dispute between Pancho Villa's men and the government soldiers.<ref>Second Edition - Western Movies: A Guide to 5,105 Feature Films By Michael R. Pitts [https://books.google.com/books?id=aTX2mv0uX7UC&dq=%22She+Came+to+the+Valley%22Dean+Stockwell&pg=PA308 Page 308 3813, '"She Came to the Valley]</ref> Her husband later dies and she finds herself the subject of attention by a man called Bill who she learns is a gun runner for Villa. Pancho Villa was played by Freddy Fender.

Cast

 Ronee Blakley ... Willy Westall 
 Dean Stockwell ... Pat Westall 
 Scott Glenn ... Bill Lester 
 Freddy Fender ... Pancho Villa 
 Anna Jones ... Amara Westall 
 Jennifer Jones ... Srita Westall 
 Rafael Flores Jr. ... Benito Torres 
 Les Brecht ... Phil Allen 
 Frank Benedetto ... Captain Hernandez
 Sol Marroquin ... Colonel Vaccaro 
 Evelyn Guerrero ...Connie  
 Ruth Reeves ... Miss Thirty Six 
 Claus Eggers ... Klaus
 Detlev Nitche ... Zimmer 
 Michael Hart ... Henry 
 Dan Willis ... Mr. Courtnay 
 John Hayes ... Mr. Wright 
 Jesús Sáenz ... Mr. Torres  
 Juanita Rutledge ... Mrs. Torres 
 Cindy Klein ... Rosita 
 Miriam Moroles ... Carmella 
 Martin Sanchez ... Grandfather 
 Cedric Wood ... Sergeant Williams 
 Robby Romero ... Pepe 
 Mary Alice Artes ...Fanny 
 Frank Ray Perilli ...Emilio 
 Cruz Quintana Jr. ... Mexican boy, carpenter assistant
 Cleo Dawson ... Christmas party guest    
 W.T. Ellis ... Christmas party guest    
 Maurine Duncan ... Christmas party guest     
 T.L. Duncan ... Christmas party guest 
 Elizabeth S. Wimberly ... Christmas party guest   
 Lucy Wallace McClelland ... Christmas party guest  
 Peggy Price ... Christmas party guest   
 Frank Strickland ... Christmas party guest 
 Pat Putnam ... Christmas party guest  
 Betty Lerma ... Christmas party guest  
 Jacquelyn Band ... Christmas party guest   
 Kathe Cunha ... Christmas party guest  
 Yolanda Gonzáles ... Christmas party guest  
 Richard Tedrow ... Christmas party guest  
 Curtis Davis ... Christmas party guest   
 Dorothy K. Breyfogle ... Christmas party guest 
 Claudio Flores ... Christmas party guest  
 Lenora Flores ... Christmas party guest   
 Minerva Black ... Christmas party guest  
 Stella Garcia ... Christmas party guest 
 Cora De La Garza ... Christmas party guest   
 Marc Perilli ... Christmas party guest 
 Ken Broughton ... Bartender

Production
The film is a western set in 1915.
It is based on one of Cleo Dawson's novels that was written in 1943. The title of the novel was, She Came to the Valley: A Novel of the Lower Rio Grande Valley, Mission Texas. It is said to be based on her mothers experiences. The film was shot in South Texas's Rio Grande Valley, but a small portion was shot in Oklahoma.
In its first run it broke weekend attendance records at Rio Grande theatres.

In January 1979, Maria Luz Corral de Villa came to McAllen, Texas, a south border town to see Kika de la Garza, to present him with a pardon request for her late husband to be exonerated for his actions against the United States. Ms de Villa who at the age of 84 was in frail health arrived by air ambulance. She was assisted by aide Sol Marroquin. Marroquin, the author of Part of the Team (Story of an American Hero)'' also played the part of Colonel Vaccaro in the film.

About three decades later in July 2008, there was a reunion with some of the cast having a party at the Mission Historical Museum.

References

External links
 She Came to the Valley at Imdb

1979 films
1979 Western (genre) films
Films set in the 1910s
Films directed by Albert Band
1970s English-language films